Donacia microcephala is a species of leaf beetle, that is distributed throughout Iran, Iraq, and Turkey.

Description
The species have a gray coloured wings, with orange legs and antennae. Their head is black.

References

Beetles described in 1904
Beetles of Asia
Donaciinae